Elfriede Trötschel (11 December 1913 – 20 June 1958) was a German operatic soprano, she was a versatile singer with a wide-ranging repertoire.

She studied in her native Dresden with Sophie Kuhnau-Bernard and Paul Schoffler. Noticed by conductor Karl Böhm, she made her stage debut at the Staatsoper Dresden, in 1933, aged only 20, and where she remained until 1950. She made her debut at the Berlin State Opera and at the Vienna State Opera in 1951. She made guest appearances in Florence, Naples, and Lisbon, and appeared at the Glyndebourne Festival, as Susanna, in 1953, and at the Royal Opera House in London, as Zdenka in 1954.

Her repertory included such diverse roles as Agathe in Der Freischütz, Marenka in The Bartered Bride, Antonia in the Tales of Hoffmann, the title role in Rusalka, Violetta in La traviata, Cio-Cio-San in Madama Butterfly, Hanna in The Merry Widow, etc.

She was also an admired recitalist. Her career was cut short by her sudden death of cancer in Berlin at the age of 44, while still at the height of her power.

Selected recordings
 Smetana - Die Verkaufte Braut - Elfriede Trötschel, Richard Holm, Georg Stern, Frithof Sentpaul, Martha Geister - Frankfurt Radio Chorus and Orchestra, Karl Elmendorff - Cantus Classic (1953)
 Dvořák - Rusalka - Elfriede Trötschel, Helmut Schindler, Lisa Otto, Gottlob Frick - Dresden Radio Chorus and Orchestra, Joseph Keilberth - Relief (1948)
 Mahler - Symphony No 4 - RIAS Sinfonieorchester Berlin, Otto Klemperer (1956)

Sources
 Operissimo.com

1913 births
1958 deaths
German operatic sopranos
Hochschule für Musik Carl Maria von Weber alumni
20th-century German women opera singers
Deaths from cancer in Germany